Al-Ghizlaniyah is a village in southern Syria, administratively part of the Douma District of the Rif Dimashq Governorate, located east of Damascus. Nearby localities include Khirbet al-Ward to the west, al-Adiliyah to the southwest, Burraq to the south, al-Hayjanah to the southeast, Judaydat al-Khas to the east, Ghasulah and Harran al-Awamid, Sakka to the north, Deir al-Asafir and Shabaa to the northwest. According to the Syria Central Bureau of Statistics (CBS), al-Ghizlaniyah had a population of 10,473 in the 2004 census. It is the administrative center of the al-Ghizlaniyah nahiyah ("subdistrict") which consisted of 13 localities with a collective population of 36,715 in 2004.

References

Populated places in Douma District
Towns in Syria